G 1/03 and G 2/03 are two decisions of the Enlarged Board of Appeal of the European Patent Office (EPO), which were both issued on April 8, 2004.

The decisions, which are identical, relate to the allowability of introducing disclaimers during the prosecution of a European patent application or during opposition proceedings relating to a granted European patent. More precisely, they relate to whether and under which circumstances an amendment introducing a negative limitation to a claim is allowable, when neither the negative limitation nor the subject-matter excluded by it from the scope of the claim have a basis in the application as filed.

Decision 

The Board ruled that introducing a disclaimer which has no basis in the application as filed may be allowable in order to:
 restore novelty by delimiting a claim against state of the art under , i.e. against a novelty-destroying conflicting application (a first European patent application is said to be a "conflicting application" when it was filed before the effective date of filing of a second European patent application, but when this first application was published only after the effective date of filing of the second application);
 restore novelty by delimiting a claim against an accidental anticipation under , where an anticipation is said to be accidental if it is so unrelated to and remote from the claimed invention that the person skilled in the art would never have taken it into consideration when making the invention; and
 disclaim subject-matter which, under Articles 52 to 57 EPC, is excluded from patentability for non-technical reasons. (Headnote of the decision, item II.1)

The Board however set out stringent criteria for their application (which have later led to many disclaimers being found inadmissible): 
 "a disclaimer should not remove more than is necessary either to restore novelty or to disclaim subject-matter excluded from patentability for non-technical reasons"; (Headnote, item II.2)
 "a disclaimer which is or becomes relevant for the assessment of inventive step or sufficiency of disclosure adds subject-matter contrary to "; and (Headnote, item II.3)
 "a claim containing a disclaimer must meet the requirements of clarity and conciseness of ". (Headnote, item II.4)

Decisions G 1/03 and G 2/03 only apply to "undisclosed disclaimers", i.e. disclaimers which are not disclosed in the application as filed. The framework of these decisions is limited to "(originally) undisclosed disclaimers".

See also 
 Amendments under the European Patent Convention

References

Further resources 

 
: "Patent protection for technical inventions"
: "Avoiding the exclusion of methods of treatment by surgery from patent protection under  - disclaimer"
: "Determining the disclosure of the relevant prior art - accidental disclosure"
: "Sufficiency of disclosure - introduction"
: "Parts of the application relevant for assessing sufficiency of disclosure - alleged effect not a feature of the claims"
: "Clarity and completeness of disclosure - indication of at least 'one way'"
: "Clarity and completeness of disclosure - invention to be performed over whole range claimed"
: "Ambiguous parameters - essential parameters"
: "Reproducibility - repeatability"
: "Reproducibility - post-published documents"
: "Level of disclosure required for medical use – plausibility - principles established by the case law"
: "Level of disclosure required for antibodies"
: "G 2/98 and the concept of disclosure – interpretation in the same way as for "
: "Enabling disclosure in the priority document"
: "First application in respect of the invention - identity of invention"
: "Multiple priorities or partial priority for one claim - application of G 1/15 in the jurisprudence of the boards"
: " – added subject-matter - general principles"
: "Selections from two lists – singling out a combination of features - principles"
: "Disclaimers - definition"
: "Disclaimers - standards for examining disclosed and undisclosed disclaimers"
: "Disclaimers - standards for examining disclosed and undisclosed disclaimers - principles established in G 1/03 and G 2/03 for undisclosed disclaimers"
: "Disclaimers - standards for examining disclosed and undisclosed disclaimers - principles established in G 2/10 for disclosed disclaimers"
: "Disclaimers - standards for examining disclosed and undisclosed disclaimers - explanations in G 1/16"
: "Disclaimers - decisions applying the criteria established by the Enlarged Board in G 1/03 and G 1/16 - accidental anticipation"
: "Disclaimers - decisions applying the criteria established by the Enlarged Board in G 1/03 and G 1/16 - accidental anticipation - disclosure of the interfering document not novelty destroying"
: "Disclaimers - decisions applying the criteria established by the Enlarged Board in G 1/03 and G 1/16 - accidental anticipation - disclaimer covered more than what was disclosed in the prior art"
: "Disclaimers - decisions applying the criteria established by the Enlarged Board in G 1/03 and G 1/16 - drafting of disclaimers – delimitation against any potential prior art"
: "Disclaimers - decisions applying the criteria established by the Enlarged Board in G 1/03 and G 1/16 - drafting of disclaimers – clarity"
: "Disclaimers - decisions applying the criteria established by the Enlarged Board in G 1/03 and G 1/16 - drafting of disclaimers – clarity - disclaimer excluding treatment by surgery or therapy"
: "Disclaimers - decisions applying the criteria established by the Enlarged Board in G 1/03 and G 1/16 - drafting of disclaimers – clarity - hiding a disclaimer"
: "Disclaimers - decisions applying the criteria established by the Enlarged Board in G 1/03 and G 1/16 - drafting of disclaimers – clarity - interpretation of terms"
: "Disclaimers - decisions applying the criteria established by the Enlarged Board in G 1/03 and G 1/16 - drafting of disclaimers – clarity - disclaimer removing more than strictly necessary to restore novelty for clarity reasons"
: "Disclaimers - decisions applying the criteria established by the Enlarged Board in G 1/03 and G 1/16 - drafting of disclaimers – undisclosed disclaimer must not relate to the teaching of the invention"
: "Disclaimers - decisions applying the criteria established by the Enlarged Board in G 1/03 and G 1/16 - drafting of disclaimers – positive features – G 1/03 not applicable"
: "Disclaimers - decisions applying the criteria established by the Enlarged Board in G 1/03 and G 1/16 - drafting of disclaimers – negative feature implicitly disclosed in original application – G 1/03 not applicable"
: "Disclaimers - applicability of the decisions of the enlarged board to cases already pending"
: "Disclaimers - no analogy with G 1/03 where a disclaimer already in the application as filed is deleted"
: " – added subject-matter - "comprises", "consists of", "consists essentially of", "contains""
: "Legitimate expectation and case law - case law deviating from or overruling the practice"
: "Application of the rules of interpretation - teleological interpretation"
: "Formal requirements - anonymously filed observations"
: "Exceptions to the prohibition of reformatio in peius - undisclosed disclaimer"

External links 
 Decisions on the "EPO boards of appeal decisions" section of the EPO web site:
 G 1/03,  
 G 2/03, 
 

G 2003 1 and G 2003 1
2004 in case law
2004 in Europe